Brian Allen Hatfield (born July 8, 1966) served in the Washington State Senate and the Washington State House of Representatives, representing the 19th Legislative District, a district that includes Cowlitz, Grays Harbor, Pacific, Lewis and Wahkiakum Counties.

After serving ten years in the Washington State House of Representatives(1994–2004), Hatfield resigned in 2004 to work full-time for Lieutenant Governor Brad Owen.

He was appointed in 2006 to the Senate to replace Mark Doumit.  He received 73.89% of the vote in the 2007 special election and was re-elected, without opposition, to a four-year term in 2008. In the Senate, Hatfield chaired the Agriculture, Water & Rural Economic Development Committee and serves on the Economic Development, Trade & Innovation Committee and the Ways & Means Committee. On September 1, 2015, Hatfield resigned to serve as Washington Governor Jay Inslee’s sector lead for forest products.

References

External links
https://web.archive.org/web/20100729084103/http://www.senatedemocrats.wa.gov/senators/hatfield/biography.htm
 Brian A. Hatfield at ourcampaigns.com

1966 births
Living people
Hatfield family
Members of the Washington House of Representatives
Washington (state) state senators